Joshua Richeson (born September 4, 1981) is an American stock car racing driver. He has made 24 career starts in the NASCAR Busch Series (now Xfinity), one start in the Truck Series, and five in the ARCA Racing Series. He is the nephew of former NASCAR Cup Series driver Brett Bodine.

Racing career
Richeson made his Nationwide Series debut at Richmond International Raceway in September 2001. He drove the No. 06 Bodine Racing Ford Taurus into the field with a 33rd place qualifying effort, but was involved with a crash on lap 72 and finished 40th.

Bodine put together some sponsorship deals from Smucker's and Timberland to put Richeson in the car for seven races in 2002. He ran better at Daytona, starting 25th and finishing 30th. In these seven events, his best finish was only 28th place, at Rockingham Motor Speedway.

Other than driving his uncle's car, Richeson ran for other teams in 2001 and 2002. But after being released from Bodine Racing, Richeson found only one-race deals for the next few years.

In 2002 and 2003, he drove eight races for the Havill-Spoerl team in car No. 67. However, the team struggled, and Richeson did not finish any races. His best finish was a 35th at Memphis, but he did record his career-best start of 19th at Pikes Peak International Raceway.

In 2004, he twice recorded his best career finish of 27th, first at Daytona driving the No. 43 for Curb Agajanian Performance Group and later at Gateway in the No. 49 Advil Ford (for the injured Derrike Cope). He drove for Jay Robinson Racing's No. 28 team at Milwaukee, finishing 40th. He drove in the No. 97 AmericInn Chevy at New Hampshire, finishing 42nd.

In 2004, Richeson drove the Curb-Agajanian Craftsman Truck Series truck. Josh started the race at Darlington in 36th, the last truck in the field, but drove to a 25th-place finish. In 2006, he returned to the Busch Series, driving the No. 28 Ford for Jay Robinson at Gateway International Raceway.

In 2019 Josh found himself back behind the driver's seat. Josh began driving for legendary chassis builder Billy Hess. Hess had found success as a chassis builder and was branching out from pavement cars to dirt late models. Josh won several late model races in the 2019 season. Josh currently participates in regional super late model racing throughout the southeast. He is also building his own late model chassis in conjunction with Justin Shaw, the grandson of the late C.J. Rayburn.

Personal life
Josh has been a vegetarian since 2017.

Motorsports career results

NASCAR
(key) (Bold – Pole position awarded by qualifying time. Italics – Pole position earned by points standings or practice time. * – Most laps led.)

Busch Series

Craftsman Truck Series

ARCA Re/Max Series
(key) (Bold – Pole position awarded by qualifying time. Italics – Pole position earned by points standings or practice time. * – Most laps led.)

References

External links
 

1981 births
Living people
NASCAR drivers
People from Troutman, North Carolina
Racing drivers from North Carolina
ARCA Menards Series drivers
Bodine family